Stefan Büchel (born 30 June 1986) is a former international footballer from Liechtenstein who played as a midfielder. Büchel last played club football for USV Eschen/Mauren, and formerly played for FC Vaduz.

External links
 

1989 births
Living people
Liechtenstein footballers
Liechtenstein international footballers
FC Vaduz players
Association football midfielders